The 2022–23 Washington State Cougars men's basketball team represents Washington State University during the 2022–23 NCAA Division I men's basketball season. The team is led by fourth-year head coach Kyle Smith. The Cougars play their home games at the Beasley Coliseum in Pullman, Washington as members in the Pac-12 Conference.

Previous season
The Cougars finished the 2021–22 season 22–15, 11–9 in Pac-12 play to finish in a three way tie for 5th place. They defeated California in the first round of the Pac-12 tournament before losing to UCLA in the quarterfinals. They received an at-large bid to the NIT as a 4th seed in the SMU bracket where they defeated Santa Clara, SMU and BYU to advanced to the semifinals where they lost to Texas A&M.

Offseason

Departures

Incoming transfers

2022 recruiting class

Roster

Schedule and results

|-
!colspan=9 style=| Regular season

|-
!colspan=9 style=| Pac-12 Tournament

|-
!colspan=9 style=| NIT

Source:

References

Washington State
Washington State Cougars men's basketball seasons
Washington State
Washington State
Washington State